Nor Aniza binti Haji Idris (born 27 August 1968) in the Malaysian music industry, is known in her home country as the "Queen of Ethnic Pop". The genre she plays is known as "irama Malaysia", which fuses local traditional genres with Anglo-American pop music. Lyrically, her music includes references to the revival of traditional Malay music. She began her career as a wedding singer, and soon found herself in the recording studio after participating the Bintang RTM (a talent search singing contest) in 1985.

Discography

Studio albums

Duet/compilation albums

Filmography

Film

Awards and Accolades

Anugerah Industri Muzik

Anugerah Juara Lagu

Anugerah Bintang Popular

References 

Living people
1968 births
21st-century Malaysian women singers
Malaysian actresses
Malaysian film actresses
Malaysian television actresses
Malay-language singers
People from Johor
Malaysian people of Malay descent
Malaysian Muslims
Bintang RTM participants
20th-century Malaysian women singers